Runaway Daughters is a 1994 television film directed by Joe Dante that originally aired on the cable television network Showtime as part of the anthology series Rebel Highway. It is a loose remake of Runaway Daughters, an American International Pictures production from 1956, the year in which both the original and the remake are set. Much of the cast of Dante's The Howling is reunited on this film, including Christopher Stone, Dee Wallace, Robert Picardo, Dick Miller, and Belinda Balaski.

Plot
The title characters are Angie Gordon, Mary Nicholson, and Laura Cahn. Their picaresque adventure begins in 1956 when Mary has a pregnancy scare after letting Bob Randolph go too far with her. Mr. Russoff, named for Lou Rusoff who wrote the screenplay of the original version, is a widower from the wrong side of the tracks, and he seeks to cover his tracks by enlisting in the United States Navy. Angie and Laura accompany Mary in a flight from the suburbs as she decides what to do about her pregnancy. Along the way, they meet bully cops and redneck survivalists with rifles.

Cast
 Julie Bowen as Angie Gordon
 Holly Fields as Mary Nicholson
 Jenny Lewis as Laura Cahn
 Paul Rudd as Jimmy Rusoff
 Chris Young as Bob Randolph
 Dick Miller as Roy Farrell

Production
The Gordons are played by the Stones, the Nicholsons by Balaski and Innerspace'''s Joe Flaherty, and the Cahns played by Picardo and Wendy Schaal, also both late of Innerspace. Dick Miller plays Roy Farrell, a private detective hired to find the girls. Also in small roles are Dante regular Mark McCraken and the producer of the original version, Samuel Z. Arkoff. Roger Corman, along with his wife, Julie Corman, play the parents of the boyfriend of one of the title characters.

The script was written by Charles S. Haas and in many ways is a companion piece to his previous collaboration with Dante, Matinee''.

Fabian Forte, who was under contract to AIP in the sixties, has a small role.

Release
The film originally aired on Showtime on August 12, 1994.

Home media
The film was released on DVD in March 2005.

References

External links 
 

1994 television films
1994 films
1990s English-language films
1990s comedy road movies
American comedy road movies
Remakes of American films
American television films
Films directed by Joe Dante
Films scored by Hummie Mann
Films set in 1956
Films set in San Diego
Films produced by Debra Hill
Rebel Highway
1990s American films